The Battle of Gulnabad (Sunday, March 8, 1722) was fought between the military forces from Hotaki Dynasty and the army of the Safavid Empire. It further cemented the eventual fall of the Safavid dynasty, which had been declining for decades.

Aftermath
After the battle was won, the Hotaks began slowly but surely to march on deeper into Persia, and eventually towards Isfahan, the Safavid Persian capital. Numbers and casualty figures of the Gulnabad battle are believed to be between 5,000 and 15,000 dead Safavid soldiers.

See also
Battle of Damghan

References

Further reading
 Axworthy, Michael (2006). The Sword of Persia: Nader Shah, from Tribal Warrior to Conquering Tyrant. I.B. Tauris, London. 
 Malleson, George Bruce. History of Afghanistan, from the Earliest Period to the Outbreak of the War of 1878. Elibron.com, London. 
 J. P. Ferrier (1858). History of the Afghans. Publisher: Murray.

External links
World Timelines - Battle of Gulnabad: Afghans defeat Safavids and take control of most of Persia
Conflicts, some details on the battle
Battle of Gulnabad, brief

The Battle of Gulnabad
1722 in Iran
Gulnabad
Gulnabad
History of Razavi Khorasan Province